John Farey may refer to:

John Farey Sr. (1766–1826), English geologist
John Farey Jr. (1791–1851), his son, mechanical engineer

See also
John G. Fary, U.S. representative from Illinois
John Farry, Northern Irish singer/songwriter